The subgroup method is an algorithm used in the mathematical field of group theory.  It is used to find the word of an element.  It doesn't always return the minimal word, but it can return optimal words based on the series of subgroups that is used.  The code looks like this:

 function operate(element, generator)
     <returns generator operated on element>
 
 function subgroup(g)
     sequence := (set of subgroups that will be used, depending on the method.)
     word := []
     for subgroup in sequence
         coset_representatives := []
         <fill coset_representatives with coset representatives of (next subgroup)/subgroup>
         for operation in coset_representatives
             if operate(g, operation) is in the next subgroup then
                 append operation onto word
                 g = operate(g, operation)
                 break
     return word

Group theory